Scopula inscriptata is a moth of the  family Geometridae. It is found in Nigeria, Sierra Leone and South Africa.

References

Moths described in 1863
inscriptata
Moths of Africa
Insects of West Africa